In baseball, the strikeout is a statistic used to evaluate pitchers. A pitcher earns a strikeout when he puts out the batter he is facing by throwing a ball through the strike zone, "defined as that area over homeplate (sic) the upper limit of which is a horizontal line at the midpoint between the top of the shoulders and the top of the uniform pants, and the lower level is a line at the hollow beneath the kneecap", which is not put in play. Strikeouts are awarded in four situations: if the batter is put out on a third strike caught by the catcher (to "strike out swinging" or "strike out looking"); if the pitcher throws a third strike which is not caught with fewer than two outs; if the batter becomes a baserunner on an uncaught third strike; or if the batter bunts the ball into foul territory with two strikes.

Major League Baseball recognizes the player or players in each league with the most strikeouts each season. Jim Devlin led the National League in its inaugural season of 1876; he threw 122 strikeouts for the Louisville Grays. The American League's first winner was Hall of Fame pitcher Cy Young, who captured the American League Triple Crown in 1901 by striking out 158 batters, along with leading the league in wins and earned run average. Walter Johnson led the American League in strikeouts twelve times during his Hall of Fame career, most among all players. He is followed by Nolan Ryan, who captured eleven titles between both leagues (nine in the American League and two in the National League). Randy Johnson won nine strikeout titles, five coming with the Arizona Diamondbacks. Three players have won seven strikeout championships: Dazzy Vance, who leads the National League; Bob Feller; and Lefty Grove. Grover Cleveland Alexander and Rube Waddell led their league six times, and five-time winners include Steve Carlton, Roger Clemens, Sam McDowell, Christy Mathewson, Amos Rusie, and Tom Seaver.

There are several players with a claim to the single-season strikeout record. Among recognized major leagues, Matt Kilroy accumulated the highest single-season total, with 513 strikeouts for the Baltimore Orioles of the American Association in 1886. However, his name does not appear on Major League Baseball's single-season leaders list, since the American Association was independent of the constituent leagues that currently make up Major League Baseball. Several other players with high totals, including 1886 American Association runner-up Toad Ramsey (499) and 1884 Union Association leader Hugh Daily (483), do not appear either. In the National League, Charles "Old Hoss" Radbourn struck out 441 batters for the Providence Grays; however, the Providence franchise folded after the 1885 season and has no successor. Therefore, Major League Baseball recognizes his runner-up from that season, Charlie Buffinton, as the record-holder with 417 strikeouts. In the American League, Ryan leads with 383 strikeouts in 1973. The largest margin of victory for a champion is 156 strikeouts, achieved in 1883 when Tim Keefe of the American Association's New York Metropolitans posted 359 against Bobby Mathews' 203. The National League's largest margin was achieved in 1999, when Randy Johnson struck out 143 more batters than Kevin Brown. Ryan's 1973 margin of 125 strikeouts over Bert Blyleven is the best American League victory. Although ties for the championship are rare, they have occurred; Claude Passeau and Bucky Walters each struck out 137 National League batters in 1939, and Tex Hughson and Bobo Newsom tied in the American League with 113 strikeouts each in 1942. Their total is the lowest number of strikeouts accumulated to lead a league in Major League Baseball history (although Jacob deGrom only struck out 104 National League batters in 2020, the season was shortened by a pandemic to 60 game, or 37.04% of a regular season;  had that season run a full 162 games, that would have been a net of 281 strikeouts).

Key

National League

American League

Other major leagues

Footnotes
Recognized "major leagues" include the current American and National Leagues and several defunct leagues—the American Association, the Federal League, the Players' League, and the Union Association.
In baseball scorekeeping, "K" is the traditional notation for the strikeout.
In 1939, Claude Passeau played the entire season for the Cincinnati Reds, while co-leader Bucky Walters was traded from the Philadelphia Phillies to the Chicago Cubs mid-season.

References

General

Inline citations

Strikeout champions
Strikeout
Striking out the sides